Westend is a borough of the city of Wiesbaden, Hesse, Germany. With a density of about 27,000 inhabitants per km² it is the most densely populated urban district in Germany. It is located in the centre of the city.

References

Sources 
 Derived from German Wikipedia

External links 
 Official Wiesbaden-Westend website (in German)

Boroughs of Wiesbaden